The Grand Rapids Owls was a USA Hockey-sanctioned Tier III Junior A ice hockey team in the Central States Hockey League. The team played their home games at the Southside Community Ice Center in Byron Center, Michigan. The players, ages 16–20, carried amateur status under Junior A guidelines and hoped to earn a spot on higher levels of junior ice hockey in the United States and Canada, Canadian Major Junior, Collegiate, and eventually professional teams. The team suspended operations prior to the 2010-2011 season.

Alumni
The Grand Rapids Owls had many alumni move on to higher levels of junior ice hockey, NCAA Division I, Division III, ACHA College, at professional levels.

References

External links
 Official Team Website
 Official League Website

Amateur ice hockey teams in Michigan
1993 establishments in Michigan
2010 disestablishments in Michigan
Ice hockey clubs established in 1993
Sports clubs disestablished in 2010
Kent County, Michigan